The Dutch Eerste Divisie in the 1976–77 season was contested by 19 teams. Vitesse Arnhem won the championship.

New entrants
Relegated from the 1975–76 Eredivisie
 SBV Excelsior
 MVV Maastricht

League standings

Promotion competition
In the promotion competition, four period winners (the best teams during each of the four quarters of the regular competition) played for promotion to the Eredivisie.

See also
 1976–77 Eredivisie
 1976–77 KNVB Cup

References
Netherlands - List of final tables (RSSSF)

Eerste Divisie seasons
2
Neth